The 2021 Men's Asian Champions Trophy was the sixth edition of the Men's Asian Champions Trophy, a men's field hockey tournament for the six best Asian national teams organized by the Asian Hockey Federation.

It was originally scheduled to be held in from 17 to 27 November 2020 at the Maulana Bhasani Hockey Stadium in Dhaka, Bangladesh. In August 2020 the Asian Hockey Federation announced that the tournament would be postponed because of the COVID-19 pandemic in Asia to 2021 to be held from 11 to 19 March 2021. In January 2021 the tournament was postponed again and it was planned to be held from 1 to 9 October 2021. The tournament was postponed again in September 2021 and was eventually held from 14 to 22 December 2021.

South Korea won their first Asian Champions Trophy title by defeating Japan 4–2 in a shoot-out after the match finished 3–3. The defending champions India and Pakistan played in the bronze medal match which India won 4–3.

Teams
Alongside the hosts, Bangladesh, the following five teams will be participating. Malaysia had to withdraw from the tournament citing restrictive Covid quarantine.

Preliminary round

Standings

Results

First to fourth place classification

Bracket

Semi-finals

Third and fourth place

Final

Statistics

Final standings

Awards

Goalscorers

See also
2021 Women's Asian Champions Trophy

References

Men's Asian Champions Trophy
Asian Champions Trophy
Asian Champions Trophy
International field hockey competitions hosted by Bangladesh
Sport in Dhaka
Champions Trophy
Asian Champions Trophy
2020s in Dhaka